Cai Lun is a lunar impact crater located on the lunar far side near the northern pole. The crater is located in between the prominent craters Haskin and Nansen. Cai Lun was adopted and named after Chinese inventor Cai Lun by the IAU in August, 2010.

References

Further reading

External links

 LAC-1 quadrant - Map of northern lunar pole

Impact craters on the Moon